Thomann may refer to:
 Thomann (retailer), a German on-line retailer of musical instruments, especially its own Harley Benton brand

People
 Georg Paul Thomann (1945–2005), fictitious Austrian artist
 Peter Thomann (born 1940), German photographer
 Jacob Ernst Thomann von Hagelstein (c. 1588 - 1653), German baroque painter
 Günther Thomann (1957), German author, minister

See also
 Thoman (disambiguation)